Howman is a surname. Notable people with the surname include:

Chloe Howman (born 1978), English actress, daughter of Karl
Jack Howman (1919–2000), Zimbabwean politician
John Howman, English cricketer
Karl Howman (born 1952), English actor and voice actor

See also
Bowman (surname)